Pastures Hospital was a mental health facility at Mickleover in Derbyshire, England. The church is a Grade II listed building.

History
The hospital, which was designed by Henry Duesbury in the Jacobean style using a corridor layout, opened in August 1851. The chapel was completed in 1869 and additional wards were created in 1895 and in 1905. It became Derbyshire County Mental Hospital in 1918 and joined the National Health Service as Pastures Hospital in 1948.

After the introduction of Care in the Community in the early 1980s, the hospital went into a period of decline and closed in 1994. The main administration block was subsequently converted into apartments as Duesbury Court.

See also
Listed buildings in Burnaston

References

Hospitals in Derbyshire
Defunct hospitals in England
Hospital buildings completed in 1851
Hospitals established in 1851
1851 establishments in England
1994 disestablishments in England
Hospitals disestablished in 1994
Former psychiatric hospitals in England